Aminabad (also Romanized as Amīnābād; also known as Amīrābād) is a village in Bafruiyeh Rural District, in the Central District of Meybod County, Yazd Province, Iran. At the 2006 census, its population was 10, in 4 families.

References 

Populated places in Meybod County